This is a family tree of the Severan dynasty of the Roman Empire.

Detailed family tree

Other (simplified) versions

See also
List of family trees

Family tree
Ancient Roman family trees

de:Severer